RAF Kilchiaran was a Royal Air Force radar station situated on the Isle of Islay in Scotland.

See also
 Islay Airport

References

Islay
Royal Air Force stations in Scotland